Olavi Talja (20 March 1925 – 17 December 1994) was a Finnish sprinter. He competed in the men's 400 metres at the 1948 Summer Olympics, but did not advance beyond the first round.

References

External links

1925 births
1994 deaths
Athletes (track and field) at the 1948 Summer Olympics
Athletes (track and field) at the 1952 Summer Olympics
Finnish male sprinters
Finnish male middle-distance runners
Olympic athletes of Finland